The Bremer River, part of the lower Murray-Darling catchment, is a river that is located in the Adelaide Hills region in the Australian state of South Australia.

Course and features

The river descends  over its  course.

The largest town in the catchment area is Mount Barker. Other towns include Nairne and Kanmantoo. Towns on the Bremer River itself include Harrogate, Callington and Langhorne Creek, where the floodwaters are used to irrigate the local vineyards.

The river is crossed by the Old Princes Highway near Callington.

Etymology
One recorded Aboriginal name for the Bremer River was Miochi.  On 31 December 1837 the first European visitor, Robert Cock, named it the Hindmarsh River, in deference to the first Governor, John Hindmarsh. This led to the following proclamation by the second Governor, George Gawler, appearing in the South Australian Gazette, effective 26 June 1839, ‘His Excellency the Governor having observed that to the southward [of Adelaide] there are two rivers named ‘The Hindmarsh’ – one flowing into Encounter Bay, and the other into Lake Alexandrina – is pleased to direct that the latter river shall in future be named the ‘River Bremer’, in the public maps, in order to avoid confusion in the geographical description of the province.’  The man so honoured by the renaming was the distinguished British Royal Navy officer James Bremer, who happened to command HMS Alligator, which conveyed Hindmarsh back to England.

See also

References

External links

Tributaries of the Murray River
Rivers of South Australia
Adelaide Hills